Chris Evans (born October 5, 1997) is an American football running back for the Cincinnati Bengals of the National Football League (NFL). He played college football at Michigan and was drafted by the Bengals in the sixth round of the 2021 NFL Draft.

Early years

A native of Indianapolis, Evans attended Ben Davis High School in that city. As a high school junior in 2014, he rushed for over 1,200 yards and 18 touchdowns and caught 51 passes for 676 yards and 10 touchdowns. 

As a high school senior in 2015, he rushed for over 1,100 yards and 15 touchdowns and caught 40 passes for 511 yards and four touchdowns.  He scored 47 touchdowns in his final two years at Ben Davis High. He also competed four years of track at Ben Davis High. In high school, he ran the 100-meter dash in 10.9 seconds. The 110m hurdles in 14.28 seconds electronically which placed him 3rd at his state meet. Evans was also a very successful long jumper, improving from a 19 feet 11 inches to a 23 feet 1 inch and 25 feet 1 inch by his senior year.

College career

Recruiting and commitment
In June 2015, Evans, a long-time Ohio State fan, attended a Michigan Wolverines football satellite camp in Indianapolis.  He caught the eye of Michigan coach Jim Harbaugh who proceeded to court Evans' parents. Evans gave his verbal commitment to play football at Michigan two days later. At the time, Evans said, "If coach Harbaugh thinks you're good, you must be."

After accepting an offer from Michigan, Evans was pursued by Ohio State, but he tweeted in early January 2016 that, though he was flattered by Ohio State's interest, he would maintain his commitment to Michigan.

Recruited as an athlete, Evans was known for his versatility, as he saw action in high school at running back, slot receiver and cornerback. During the preseason training camp prior to his freshman year in 2016, Evans drew praise for his explosiveness and speed. Teammate Drake Johnson described him as "mad athletic" and "real smooth . . . like butter smooth, we're just like 'ooh, wow' ", and added, "He just makes it look smooth and easy. He looks effortless when he does stuff, 'yeah, that was nice.'"

Evans has been described as having "deceptive looks." Bob Wojnowski of The Detroit News wrote: "He wears glasses (contacts during the game) and has sported a high-top haircut since he was a kid watching Will Smith on “The Fresh Prince of Bel-Air.”

2016 season
On September 3, 2016, Evans appeared in his first game for Michigan.  In the first three quarters, he rushed for 112 yards on eight carries (14.0 yards per carry), including an 18-yard touchdown run in the second quarter and a 43-yard touchdown run in the third quarter. He became the third Michigan player to rush for over 100 yards in his college debut. After the game, head coach Jim Harbaugh said, "I knew Chris Evans was special. What you saw today is what we have been seeing in practice the last month.  He's a special football player. And you didn't get to see everything he can do." Mark Snyder of the Detroit Free Press wrote of the game that "the spark came from freshman Chris Evans and his wiggle. Evans brought a different dimension than the bruising backs, maybe something U-M hasn’t seen since Denard Robinson."

Mitch Albom dubbed Evans "Captain Fantastic" and added "it might be a case of A Star is Born."  Michigan running backs coach Tyrone Wheatley said of Evans: "He's like my Steph Curry in the room. Meaning that he can create his own space, can win one-on-ones and, most surprisingly ... I didn't realize how tough he was between the tackles."

On October 8, 2016, Evans registered his second 100-yard rushing game in a 78-0 victory over Rutgers.  Evans led Michigan's rushing attack with 153 yards on 11 carries for an average of 13.9 yards per carry.

Through the first six games of the 2016 season, Evans was Michigan's leading rusher with 400 rushing yards and three touchdowns on 48 carries, an average of 8.3 yards per carry.

In the 2016 Capital One Orange Bowl, Evans scored a 30-yard touchdown to give his team the lead with less than two minutes to play. Evans ultimately finished second on the team to De'Veon Smith with 614 rushing yards. His four rushing touchdowns were fifth on the team behind Smith, Khalid Hill, Ty Isaac, and Karan Higdon.

2017 season
During the 2017 season, Evans mainly served as the backup running back to Karan Higdon. He had a career day against Minnesota on November 4 when he ran for 191 yards and two touchdowns. Evans ultimately finished second on the team behind Higdon with 685 rushing yards on the year and six rushing touchdowns.

2018 season

Evans once again served as the number two back behind Karan Higdon in 2018. His most successful game came against Western Michigan on September 8, when he rushed for 86 yards and two rushing touchdowns. Evans finished the year with 423 rushing yards and four touchdowns.

2019 season
Evans, after the graduation of Karan Higdon, was set to be the Wolverines' leading returning rusher coming into the 2019 season as a senior. In February 2019, the team released a statement that Evans was no longer with the program. He announced via Twitter that he had "academic issues" and planned to continue his career at Michigan. In June, Michigan head coach Jim Harbaugh confirmed that Evans would be suspended for the 2019 season, but would be eligible to return in 2020. It was later announced that Evans would be returning for the 2020 season as a fifth-year player.

College statistics

Professional career

Evans was drafted by the Cincinnati Bengals in the sixth round, 202nd overall, of the 2021 NFL Draft. He signed his four-year rookie contract with Cincinnati on May 17.

He scored his first professional touchdown on a 24-yard catch from Joe Burrow in the first quarter of the Bengals' win over the Detroit Lions on October 17, 2021.  Evans finished the season with 228 yards from scrimmage and two touchdowns, along with 15 receptions.

Although he only returned two kickoffs during the season and one when he was in college, he was named the team's starting kick returner for their playoff game against the Las Vegas Raiders.  Evans returned five kickoffs for 103 yards and rushed once for nine yards in the Bengals 26-19 win. He had three kickoff returns for 83 yards and a four-yard carry in the team's win against the Tennessee Titans in the Divisional Round. Evans scored his first touchdown of the 2022 season in the Bengals' week 13 win over the Kansas City Chiefs.

References

External links
Cincinnati Bengals bio
Michigan Wolverines bio

1997 births
Living people
American football running backs
Cincinnati Bengals players
Michigan Wolverines football players
Players of American football from Indianapolis